Hellborn (album) is the second album from the heavy metal band David Shankle Group. Other than David Shankle himself, the entire band Personnel is different from that of the debut album. The Voyage features guest guitar solos by TD Clark, Joe Stump and Michael Angelo Batio.

Track listing 
 Asylum God – 04:07
 The Lie – 03:48
 Bleeding Hell – 04:53
 Living for Nothing – 04:09
 Left to Die – 04:16
 Hellborn – 04:10
 The Tyrant – 04:57
 When Is it Wicked – 06:55
 Monster – 03:59
 Sins and Promises – 07:03
 Cold and Diseased – 03:40
 No Remorse – 05:36
 The Voyage – 06:54

Personnel 
Dennis Hirschauer – Vocals
David Shankle – Guitars
Jeff Kylloe – Bass
Brad Sabathne – Drums

2007 albums